Hobart Coaches was a Tasmanian coach company. It was originally started as a subsidiary company of Hazell Bros with services starting in the Kingston and Blackmans Bay, D'Entrecasteaux Channel, Huon, Richmond and New Norfolk areas.

From there, it increased the passenger and freight areas to St Helens on the east coast, Queenstown on the west coast and Port Arthur down the Peninsula.

With increasing popularity, Hobart Coaches enlarged its fleet of vehicles and began day and extended tours.

The company then became involved in extending services to what is known as the Main Rd. service travelling between Launceston, Devonport and Burnie. This continued for many years until 1999 when Hazell Bros sold Hobart Coaches to Tasmanian Metro Coaches.

Service-wise, the Blackmans Bay, Richmond and New Norfolk services went to Metro, the Main Road service went to Redline Coaches and the tour section with east coast, west coast, Port Arthur and Huon were purchased by a mainland company now known as Tassielink Transit.

Hobart Coaches fleet were re-painted all white with a new Yellow and Green Logo, the same colours worn by Metro Tasmania. All of the coaches were re-numbered from #1 to #11. The coaches were also frequently seen doing 'Metro' bus runs, This created some confusion for the travelling public as they were not used to travelling on coaches on their daily travels, so Metro later revised the colour scheme to Red/White, shortly after this Metro started to wind down Hobart Coaches operations.

In the years following the Richmond Service was sold off to TassieLink Transit and the New Norfolk service to O'Driscoll Coaches / Derwent Valley Link.

Metro Tasmania still retain the Kingston Area but have changed all services to 'Metro' and the name Hobart Coaches is no longer used.

The last two Hobart Coaches have since been sold, #9 is now a camper, and #11 sold to another operator.

References

External links
Hobart Coaches official web site (Now directs to metrotas.com,au)

Transport in Hobart